Westminster attack may refer to any of the following attacks that have occurred within Westminster or the City of Westminster:

Attacks
The Blitz (1940–1941) – affected London as a whole including Westminster.
1973 Westminster bombing, a car bomb outside the Home Office on Thorney Street
1974 Houses of Parliament bombing
1975 Piccadilly bombing, at a bus stop near The Ritz and Green Park tube station
Assassination of Airey Neave, which took place at the Houses of Parliament car park in 1979
Downing Street mortar attack (1991)
2017 Westminster attack, at Westminster Bridge and the Houses of Parliament
2017 Westminster cyberattack
2018 Westminster car attack

Attempted attacks
Gunpowder Plot (1605) by Guy Fawkes et al.

See also
 London attack

History of the City of Westminster